Maddur Assembly constituency is one of the 224 constituencies in the Karnataka Legislative Assembly of Karnataka a south state of India. It is also part of Mandya Lok Sabha constituency.

Members of Legislative Assembly

Mysore State
 1951: H. K. Veeranna Gowda, Indian National Congress

 1957: H. K. Veeranna Gowda, Indian National Congress

 1962: S. M. Krishna, Independent

 1967: M. Manchegowda, Indian National Congress

 1972: A. D. Bili Gowda, Indian National Congress

Karnataka State
 1978: M. Manche Gowda, Janata Party

 1983: M. Manche Gowda, Independent

 1984 (By-Poll): Jayavani M. Manche Gowda, Indian National Congress

 1985: B. Appajigowda, Janata Party

 1989: S. M. Krishna, Indian National Congress

 1994: M. Mahesh Chand, Janata Dal

 1999: S. M. Krishna, Indian National Congress

 2004: D. C. Thammanna, Indian National Congress

 2008: M. S. Siddaraju, Janata Dal (Secular)

 2008 (By-Poll): Kalpana Siddaraju, Janata Dal (Secular)

 2013: D. C. Thammanna, Janata Dal (Secular)

 2018: D. C. Thammanna, Janata Dal (Secular)

See also
 Mandya district
 List of constituencies of Karnataka Legislative Assembly

References

Assembly constituencies of Karnataka
Mandya district